The Venerable Robert Peirson was Archdeacon of Cleveland from 22 August 1787 to his death om 4 November 1805.
 
Pierson was educated at Jesus College, Cambridge. He was the Incumbent at Husthwaite.

References

Alumni of Jesus College, Cambridge
18th-century English Anglican priests
19th-century English Anglican priests
Archdeacons of Cleveland
Clergy from Yorkshire
1805 deaths